The Norwegian Swimming Federation ( - NSF) is the national federation of swimming in Norway. The president is Per Rune Eknes (since 2009) and the 
vice-president is Svein-Harald Afdal. The Norwegian Swimming Federation was founded in 1910.

The organisation was founded in 1910 and is headquartered at Ullevaal Stadium in Oslo. It regulates all swimming sports, including diving, water polo and synchronised swimming, trains instructors, organises swimming classes for children and adults, and issues achievement badges. It publishes a members' magazine called Norsk Svømming. It will open a new swimming centre in Bergen early in 2014, at which an elite swimming series will be based and which will include a museum of swimming.

The Norwegian Swimming Federation is an affiliate of the Norwegian Confederation of Sports and the International Swimming Federation. In 2009 it reached a new membership record at almost 50,000, after gaining 3,000 members in the previous year.

Organisation
President: Per Rune Eknes
Vice-president: Svein-Harald Afdal

See also

References

Further reading
 Jacob T. Larsen. Svømming for alle: Norges svømmeforbund 1910–2010. Oslo: Norges Svømmeforbund, 2010.

External links
 

Norway
Swimming
Swimming organizations